Woodman Hollow State Preserve is located in Webster County, Iowa,  southeast of Fort Dodge and  northwest of Lehigh. The preserve is a satellite area of Dolliver Memorial State Park, located 2 miles to the south.  Some older maps refer to the area as "Woodman's Hollow State Park."

History

Geological Formation and Early Human Use

Many of the rock bluffs lining the interior of the preserve are composed of sandstones, limestones, and dolomites.  The rock was produced over time from chemical and physical processes acting on the bed of ancient marine seaways that once covered vast portions of North America between 66 and 550 million years ago.  The shoreline of the ancient seaways migrated back and forth from roughly Oklahoma to Illinois, and the river delta systems deposited clay, mud, peat, and channel sands across the area.  Over time, these deposits were compacted and cemented into the familiar rock formations observed today.  Significant erosion of glacial deposits by the Des Moines River and associated tributaries has helped to expose these deposits over time after the retreat of the Wisconsin Glaciation about 12,000 to 14,000 years before present. Two man-made rock shelters found within the preserve provided evidence to suggest that Woodland Indians or Archaic Indians inhabited the area as early as 2,800 years before present.

Designation as a State Public Area

The Iowa Board of Conservation purchased the land that would become Woodman Hollow in 1927 from A. S. Woodman.  The original intent of the area was for it to be developed as a state park, and in the 1930s the Civilian Conservation Corps constructed an access road, two latrines, some trails, and the foundations for a trail bridge.  The State of Iowa later decided to discontinue development of the area and to leave it in its natural condition.  The land was officially designated as a biological, geological, and archaeological state preserve on August 12, 1970.

Today

Overview

The preserve features several deep, forested ravines, which combine into a larger ravine with a small creek that empties into the Des Moines River. The creek is spring and runoff fed. Sandstone bedrock lines the ravine walls. The two latrines constructed decades ago were not removed after efforts to develop the area into a state park were abandoned, and have fallen into heavy dis-repair. The access road was removed, and most trails within the park have eroded away or have become overgrown, except for those maintained by the footsteps of infrequent visitors.

Flora

Over 500 species of plants can be found within Woodman Hollow.  The preserve is said to have one of the largest varieties of ferns in the state of Iowa.  Trees found in the area include white and red oak in the uplands.  Numerous old growth trees, some over 300 years in age, exist within the boundaries of the preserve, some old enough to be used in climate reconstruction through Dendrochronology.  Near the river, steep ravine walls on both sides of the creek exceed  in height - steep enough to vary the species of flora over short distances.

Access to the Preserve

A small, grassy parking area provides a space for two vehicles. The largest of the waterfalls and the beginning of the shallow gorge are directly south of the entrance corridor.

No hunting or camping is allowed within the boundaries of the preserve.

References

Iowa state preserves
Civilian Conservation Corps in Iowa
Protected areas established in 1970
Protected areas of Webster County, Iowa